Ludwig Danzer (15 November 1927 – 3 December 2011) was a German geometer working in discrete geometry. He was a student of Hanfried Lenz, starting his career in 1960 with a thesis about "Lagerungsprobleme".

Danzer's name is popularized in the concepts of a Danzer set, a set of points that touches all large convex sets, and the Danzer cube, an example of a non-shellable triangulation of the cube. It is an example of a power complex, studied by Danzer in the 1980s. The Danzer cube is example 8.9 in the book "Lectures on Polytopes" by G.M. Ziegler.

Danzer also found many new tilings.

Ludwig Danzer worked at the Technical University of Dortmund and died on December 3, 2011 after a long illness.

Danzer had at least ten students, the most prominent one being Egon Schulte.

References 

 
 
 

20th-century German mathematicians
1927 births
2011 deaths